Harrington Creek is a small river in San Mateo County, California and is a tributary of San Gregorio Creek.

References

See also
List of watercourses in the San Francisco Bay Area

Rivers of San Mateo County, California
Santa Cruz Mountains
Rivers of Northern California